Naldurg Fort is a historic fort in Naldurg town of Osmanabad district in Maharashtra state of India. Naldurg Fort is named after Nalraja who built the fort in medieval architectural style. The unique feature of the fort is that it encloses a knoll of basalt rock which juts out into the valley of the small Bori River and a long fortification wall with many bastions.  Other source about construction of this fort is said to have been originally built by a Hindu Raja who was a vassal of the Chalukya kings of Kalyani. It was later included in the dominions of the Bahmanis and was subsequently taken over by the Adil Shahi kings of Bijapur, from whom it passed in the hands of the Mughals in the year 1686 A.D.

References

Tourist attractions in Osmanabad district
Forts in Maharashtra